Maria Vasilevna Poezzhaeva (also tr. Mariya Vasilyevna Poezzhaeva; born 3 March 1989) is a Russian actress in theater and cinema. She had leading roles in Corrections Class (2014) and He's a Dragon (2015).

Biography
Maria Poezzhaeva was born in Perm, Perm Oblast, Russian SFSR, Soviet Union (now Perm Krai, Russia). In childhood, she studied figure skating at the palace of sports "Eaglet". She graduated from the Perm school № 124 with a medal. After graduating, she tried to enter the theater school in Saint Petersburg and then in Moscow, but on both occasions was unsuccessful.

She returned to Perm, where she continued her studies.  She again went to Moscow, and was accepted as a student at the Moscow Art Theater School.  While in school, she performed in "The Hero of Our Time".

In 2012 she graduated from the Moscow Art Theater School (the course of K. Serebrennikov). After graduation she performed at the Moscow Art Theater. A.P. Chekhov in the productions of "Fairies" and "Skylark". Later she became an actress at the Gogol Center.

Career
Her screen work began in 2010.  She played the role of Liza in the series Voices. Then there were small roles in Kamenskaya-6 (TV series 2011). Also, she had roles in Last summer in Chulimsk (Sergey Bezrukov became a shooting partner). In 2014, she had a leading role in the film Corrections Class. In 2015 Maria she starred with Matvey Lykov in the romantic fantasy film He's a Dragon.

Filmography

References

External links 

1989 births
Living people
Actors from Perm, Russia
Russian film actresses
Russian stage actresses
Russian television actresses
Actresses from Moscow
21st-century Russian actresses
Moscow Art Theatre School alumni